Elasmopoda is a genus in the "true bug" family Coreidae, order Hemiptera. The genus is native to parts of eastern and southern Africa. The species are large "twig wilter" bugs, generally brown or greyish. The femora of the hind legs are somewhat enlarged and bent, but less than those of some related genera, and either unarmed, or less armed with spikes.

The genus Elasmopoda has junior synonyms, some of them apparently the products of clerical errors, in particular:
 synonym Evagrius Distant, 1900
 synonym Holopterna Stål, 1873
 synonym Hoplopterna Stål, 1873
 synonym Hoploterna Distant, 1892

Species include:
Elasmopoda alata (Westwood, 1842)
Elasmopoda antennata (Courteaux, 1907)
Elasmopoda atramentaria (Germar, 1837)
Elasmopoda dallasi (Stål, 1873)
Elasmopoda elata Blöte, 1938
Elasmopoda falx (Drury, 1782)
Elasmopoda gladius (Distant, 1900)
Elasmopoda lunata (Signoret, 1858)
Elasmopoda parmenio Linnavuori, 1973
Elasmopoda ugandica (Kirkaldy, 1909)
Elasmopoda valga (Linnaeus, 1758)

References

Coreidae genera
Hemiptera of Africa
Pentatomomorpha genera